Cleopatrē Alcyone was the daughter of Idas and Marpessa and the wife of Meleager.

Mythology
When the war between the Calydonians and the Curetes broke out, Cleopatra persuaded her husband, Meleager, to defend the city of Calydon against the attack. This eventually resulted to the hero's demise and afterwards, Alcyone died of grief or hanged herself for it.

Notes 

Princesses in Greek mythology

References 

 Apollodorus, The Library with an English Translation by Sir James George Frazer, F.B.A., F.R.S. in 2 Volumes, Cambridge, MA, Harvard University Press; London, William Heinemann Ltd. 1921. ISBN 0-674-99135-4. Online version at the Perseus Digital Library. Greek text available from the same website.
Gaius Julius Hyginus, Fabulae from The Myths of Hyginus translated and edited by Mary Grant. University of Kansas Publications in Humanistic Studies. Online version at the Topos Text Project.
 Homer, The Iliad with an English Translation by A.T. Murray, Ph.D. in two volumes. Cambridge, MA., Harvard University Press; London, William Heinemann, Ltd. 1924. . Online version at the Perseus Digital Library.
 Homer, Homeri Opera in five volumes. Oxford, Oxford University Press. 1920. . Greek text available at the Perseus Digital Library.

Messenian characters in Greek mythology
Aetolian mythology
Suicides in Greek mythology